Guiying is a Chinese female given name, and may refer to:

 Gao Guiying, female Chinese revolutionary, rebellion-leader and army-commander
 Mu Guiying, Chinese legendary heroine
 Day Guey-ing (pinyin: Dài Guìyīng), Taiwanese politician

Chinese feminine given names